The House of Alšėniškiai was a Lithuanian princely family of Hipocentaur coat of arms. Their patrimony was the Principality of Alšėnai, which included the castles of Rokantiškės and Alšėnai.

History

Origin 
Maciej Stryjkowski relates the origins of this family to Alšis Ramuntavičius, coming from the line of Dausprungas. According to the ancient genealogy of Lithuanian princes written by Teodor Narbutt, Alšis was to be the eleventh generation of the Palemonids, and was to give rise to the Alšėniškiai, who ended in the late 16th century. What Stryjkowski or Narbutt wrote is very dubious as the distance of time is too large to prove it documentally. The history of this house, already based on some writings, only begins with Jonas Alšėniškis, whose father Algimantas (Ougemundes) presents the first historically proven generation of the Alšėniškiai.

For the first time Alšėniškiai family is mentioned in written sources at the end of the 14th century when Ivan, son of Algimantas, assisted Vytautas in the Lithuanian Civil War (1381–1384) against Jogaila. Such a late mention of strong family is attributed to the geographic location of their domain: Alšėnai was neither in the way of the Teutonic or Livonian Orders. In contemporary sources, Algimantas is mentioned only in Ivan's patronymic name. However, late and unreliable Lithuanian Chronicles created a fanciful genealogy of Algimantas that connected him to the legendary Palemonids that allegedly hailed from the Roman Empire. Modern historians have discarded the genealogy as a work of fiction not based on historical facts.

14th to 16th centuries 
The family was founded by Ivan Olshansky (fl. 1382–1402), a close ally of Vytautas, Grand Duke of Lithuania. Ivan's daughter Uliana married Vytautas while granddaughter Sophia of Halshany married Vytautas' cousin Jogaila, King of Poland. Sophia gave birth to Jogaila's sons and became the mother of the Jagiellonian dynasty which ruled Poland, Lithuania, Hungary and Bohemia. The male line of the Alšėniškiai family ended in 1556 with the death of Prince Semen (Paweł Holszański, last-but-one male representative of the family, died just one year before). Princess Maria Olshanskaya, the wife of Andrey Kurbsky, died in 1586. Their estates were inherited by the Sapieha family, which hailed from Smolensk. During the 14–16th centuries most of the family was Orthodox by faith and Ruthenian by language, although there were exceptions, in particular Paweł Holszański was a Catholic Church official.

Family tree

|- 
|style="text-align: left;"|References
Main source:
|- 
|style="text-align: left;"|Notes
The family tree is incomplete.

References
In-line

General